Wolfgang Kasack (Volfgang Germanovich Kazak; Potsdam, 20 January 1927 – Much, 10 January 2003) was a German Slavic studies scholar and translator.

After his death, his academic estate was donated to the University of Mainz.

He was son of the German writer Hermann Kasack.

Honors
 1981 Johann-Heinrich-Voß-Preis für Übersetzung
 1997 Aleksandr Men Prize

Selected works
 Lexikon der russischen Literatur ab 1917, Stuttgart, Kröner, 1976
 Russische Weihnachten: ein literarisches Lesebuch, Freiburg im Breisgau; Basel; Wien, Herder, 2000 
 Christus in der russischen Literatur: ein Gang durch ihre Geschichte von den Anfängen bis zum Ende des 20. Jahrhunderts, Stuttgart, Verl. Urachhaus, 2000 
 Der Tod in der russischen Literatur: Aufsätze und Materialien aus dem Nachlass (Hg. Frank Göbler), München, Sagner, 2005

References

External links
 

1927 births
2003 deaths
People from Potsdam
Slavists
20th-century German translators
20th-century German male writers
German male non-fiction writers